StormEngineC is a 3D graphics library written in JavaScript utilizing several HTML5 features such as WebGL, WebCL, and WebSockets. The library provides an easy way to load objects in the OBJ or Collada format and adds them to physical simulations. The source code is free and is hosted on GitHub.

Image gallery

Features 
 Real-time visualization of 3D scenes through WebGL
 Sun and spot lights
 Shadow mapping
 SSAO
 Load of objects on .obj format or Collada (.DAE)
 Physical system integrated through JigLib2
 Keyframe animation
 Option for enable edit menus
 Multiplayer utilities using Node.js
 Path Tracing render using the WebCL Nokia Extension
 Render farm option for path tracing render using Node.js

Usage 
The basic source code for initializing a small scene in StormEngineC:

<script src="js/StormEngineC/StormEngineC.class.js"></script>
<canvas id="example" width="1024" height="512"></canvas>

<script>
    stormEngineC.createWebGL({'target': 'example',
                              'editMode': true});
        
    var node = stormEngineC.createNode();
    node.loadObj({'objUrl': 'resources/obj/cornellbox.obj'});
</script>

History 
StormEngineC was developed to provide a means for displaying 3D scenes in the web browser and to easily enable a physical system with gravity and collisions for objects.

It initially appeared in the first public specification of WebGL, written in Java and called StormEngineJ. It was later ported to JavaScript which brought benefits with respect other 3D visualization methods in a web browser. For example, JavaScript does not require additional plug-ins for viewing.

The first version of the library was published on Google Code in February 2011. At the moment, there has not been offered a stable version of this.

Version 1.2 introduced a rendering system based on path tracing with the option to be used as render farm, as well as some facilities for starting up a game server using Node.js.

See also 

 WebGL
 WebCL
 WebSocket

References

External links 
 Official site
 Repository
 API Reference
 Quick reference
 StormEngineC Demos
 Learning WebGL
 WebGL libraries

3D scenegraph APIs
Application programming interfaces
Cross-platform software
Graphics libraries
Free 3D graphics software
JavaScript libraries